William Harvie Christie (1808 – 19 March 1873) was an Australian politician.

He was born in Ceylon to Thomas Christie, who was the medical inspector-general, and Mary Tolfrey. He was educated in England and entered the military, becoming a lieutenant in 1827 and a captain in 1833. In 1845 he married Ellen Harrison, with whom he had five children. That year he migrated to New South Wales, where he was promoted major in 1838. He left the military in 1839 and in 1840 was appointed assistant police magistrate at Hyde Park Barracks. He was serjeant-at-arms for the New South Wales Legislative Council from 1848 to 1852, when he joined the Council as a non-elected member and served as Postmaster-General. Christie left the Council in 1856, and died at Pyrmont in 1873.

References

External links

 

1808 births
1873 deaths
Members of the New South Wales Legislative Council
Australian people of Sri Lankan descent
Sri Lankan people of Australian descent
19th-century Australian politicians
19th-century Australian public servants